Antun Pasko Kazali (29 April 1815 – 10 January 1894) was a Croatian folk-writer, poet and translator. Born in Dubrovnik (Ragusa), he went to school in Dubrovnik, studying philosophy and theology in Zadar (Zara). He was a parish priest in Ošlje near Ston and chaplain in Šipan. As a parish priest, he often came into conflict with church authorities.  He spent his most creative period in Zadar, starting in 1855. He was a professor at the gymnasium in Zadar, teaching Latin, Greek, and Croatian (1855–1861), and in 1862 became a professor at Rijeka/Fiume gymnasium. The last ten years of his life were spent in Dubrovnik.

He has written Spjev Zlatka (published in Zadar in 1856), Trista VICA widow (Zadar, 1857), A voice from the wilderness (Zadar, 1861) and Grobnik (Rijeka, 1863). Several other works are in manuscript and the best known is Spjev Ćoso, an autobiographical poem. He was an associate and writer for the Zora Dalmatinska journal, and edited the newspapers Zadar Glasnik Dalmatinski and Smotritelj Dalmatinski. He spoke 11 world languages. The special value of his literary work is recognized in Croatian national maritime terminology.

He died in Dubrovnik.

See also
 Natko Nodilo

References

Sources

1815 births
1894 deaths
Croatian male poets
Catholic poets
19th-century Croatian poets
Croatian translators
19th-century male writers
19th-century translators
People from the Kingdom of Dalmatia